Anthuleni Katha is a 1976 Indian Telugu-language film directed by K. Balachander, starring Jaya Prada, with Fatafat Jayalaxmi, Rajinikanth and Sripriya in supporting roles. Kamal Haasan played a cameo. The film is a remake of the 1974 Tamil film Aval Oru Thodar Kathai, which was also directed by Balachander. This is Jaya Prada's first starring role, reprising the role played by Sujatha in the original and is considered to be one of her best films. This was also Rajinikanth's first major role. This film was shot in black-and-white.

Plot 
Saritha (Jaya Prada) is a working woman in a poor family. She works hard to support her widowed sister, unmarried sister, her blind younger brother, her mother, her drunkard brother Murthy (Rajinikanth) and his family. Her father abandons the family and goes on a pilgrimage. Her brother not only does not take responsibilities, but also creates additional problems for her.

She has a longtime boyfriend, who wants to marry her, but she doesn't because of her commitment to her family. His eyes now wander to Saritha's widowed younger sister (Sripriya), who reciprocates his feelings. Saritha, after reading her boyfriend's love letter to her sister, arranges for them to get married, thus giving up her chance of having a life with him. She eventually accepts a marriage proposal of her boss (Kamal Haasan), when she realises that her brother has become responsible enough to take care of her family. She also helps her distressed friend, played by Phataphat Jayalaksmi to settle in life. She decides to resign from hard work, but could not as the result of the turning point in a typical Balachandar style climax.

Cast 
 Jaya Prada as Saritha
 Phataphat Jayalaxmi as Chandra
 Rajinikanth as Murthy
 Sripriya as Bharathi
 G. V. Narayana Rao as Vikatakavi Gopal
 Prasad Babu as Thilak
 Pradeep Shakthi
 Kamal Haasan as Arun Ghosh (Cameo)

Production 
Kamal Haasan and Rajinikanth made their acting debut in Telugu with this film.

Soundtrack 
All songs are penned by Acharya Aatreya and the music was composed by M. S. Viswanathan.
 "Are Emiti Lokam", cast by Phaphat Jayalakshmi and voice by L. R. Eswari
 "Tali Kattu Subhavela", cast by Narayana Rao and voice by S. P. Balasubrahmanyam
 "Kallalo Unnadedo Kannulake Telusu", cast by Jaya Prada and voice by S. Janaki
 "Ugutundu Nee Inta Uyyala", cast by Jayaprada and voice by P. Susheela
 "Devude Icchadu Vidhi Okkati", cast by Rajinikanth and voice by Yesudas.

Reception 
In 2001, Jaya Prada herself acknowledged the impact the film had in her personal life, as she very much related to the lead character.

Awards 
Nandi Awards
 Third Best Feature Film - Bronze won by Ram Aranganal (1976)

Filmfare Awards South
 Special Award – Jaya Prada

References

External links 
 

1976 drama films
1976 films
Films about poverty in India
Films about widowhood in India
Films about women in India
Films directed by K. Balachander
Films scored by M. S. Viswanathan
Films shot in Visakhapatnam
Films with screenplays by K. Balachander
Indian black-and-white films
Indian drama films
Indian feminist films
Telugu remakes of Tamil films
1970s Telugu-language films
Unemployment in fiction